RC-2 or Cuddalore Road is a state highway that connects Puducherry with Cuddalore. It runs from Boulevard via Uppalam, Muthaliarpet, Ariyankuppam, Kirumampakkam up to Mullodai Arch (Southern Border of Puducherry District on Cuddalore Road). Due to the extension of Villupuram-Puducherry National Highway to Nagapattinam, this road got terminated at Marappalam Square. Now this road is known as Dr. Ambedkar Road.

Route 
RC-2 starts from RC-1 at Uppalam Water Tank and runs southward via Colas Nagar till the Uppalam Drain Bridge and then turn west till Muthaliarpet and from there onward it runs southward. It got terminated with NH-45A at Marappalam Square.

Landmarks 
 Indira Gandhi Sports Stadium, Puducherry
 TNSTC Depot
 Bharathi Mill

References

External links
 Official website of Public Works Department, Puducherry UT

State highways in Puducherry
Transport in Puducherry